National Register of Historic Places listings in Albany County, New York exclusive of the City of Albany: This is intended to be a complete list of properties and districts listed on the National Register of Historic Places in Albany County, New York, besides those in the City of Albany, itself (which are listed here).

The locations of National Register properties and districts (at least for all showing latitude and longitude coordinates below) may be seen in a map by clicking on "Map of all coordinates".



Current listings

Albany

Remainder of county

|}

See also

History of Albany, New York
List of New York State Historic Markers in Albany County, New York

References

External links
A useful list of the above sites, with street addresses and other information, is available at National Register of Historic Places.Com, a private site serving up public domain information on NRHPs.

Albany County, New York
Albany County, New York